The Aiken-Augusta Special was a named night train of the Southern Railway between New York City and Augusta, Georgia. Different from other long distance Southern Railway lines which tended to briefly go through the northwestern edge of South Carolina, this route went through the interior of the state. Its route marked the last directly north-south route between Charlotte, North Carolina and Columbia, South Carolina, and it marked one of the last long distance trains into Augusta, Georgia.  The train began as the Augusta Special on October 24, 1915. 

Beginning in 1928 the train had a section that split from the main route at Trenton, South Carolina and went to Aiken, South Carolina, and so the train took the name, Aiken-Augusta Special. The train was carried over Pennsylvania Railroad tracks from New York City to Washington, D.C. and in an unusual arrangement the coach cars were on a different train (#153 the Congressional southbound; #112 unnamed, northbound) from the sleeping cars between New York and Washington, and upon reaching the latter city the itinerary became merged.

Major stations on main Augusta route 

New York, NY
Newark, NJ
North Philadelphia, PA
Philadelphia 
Wilmington, DE
Baltimore, MD
Washington, D.C.
Charlottesville, VA
Lynchburg 
Danville 
Greensboro, NC
High Point
Concord
Charlotte
Rock Hill, SC
Columbia
Augusta, GA

Asheville Special 
The train had the Asheville Special (#15 south/#16 north; begun in 1930), which split from the main route in Greensboro, North Carolina and continued west from Greensboro, to Winston-Salem and then to Asheville, North Carolina. The sleeping cars were continuous from New York City to Asheville; but the coaches and the diner were strictly Asheville to Greensboro cars. The remainder of the trip, Greensboro to New York was on Aiken-Augusta Special equipment.

For four years (1966-1970) after the termination of the Augusta Special, the Asheville Special was tacked onto the Crescent from Greensboro to New York. However, southbound, the sleeping car was handled by the Southerner from New York to Greensboro.

Major stops on the Asheville-Greensboro route:
Asheville
Biltmore
Marion
Morganton
Hickory
Newton
Statesville
Winston-Salem
Greensboro

In 1970 the Asheville Special was truncated to an Asheville-Salisbury train. It was finally discontinued in 1975.

Augusta Special and demise 
With dwindling traffic in the 1950s, the Aiken spur route was eliminated and in 1953 the train reverted to the Augusta Special. Sleeper service was eliminated on October 27, 1962. Its final run as a named train between Charlotte and Augusta was on October 22, 1966.

Notes

Named passenger trains of the United States
Night trains of the United States
Passenger rail transportation in Georgia (U.S. state)
Passenger rail transportation in Delaware
Passenger rail transportation in Maryland
Passenger rail transportation in New Jersey
Passenger rail transportation in New York (state)
Passenger rail transportation in North Carolina
Passenger rail transportation in Virginia
Passenger rail transportation in Pennsylvania
Passenger rail transportation in South Carolina
Railway services introduced in 1915
Passenger trains of the Pennsylvania Railroad
Passenger trains of the Southern Railway (U.S.)
Railway services discontinued in 1966